Logan Tomkins is a rugby league footballer who plays as a  for the Widnes Vikings in the Betfred Championship.

He has played for the Wigan Warriors in the Super League, and on loan from Wigan at the Widnes Vikings and Workington Town in the Championship, and the Salford Red Devils in the top flight. Tomkins has also spent four seasons at Salford after his loan spell there.

Background
Tomkins was born in Wigan, Greater Manchester, England. He is the younger brother of fellow professionals Joel and Sam Tomkins.

Playing career

Wigan
Tomkins made his début in Super League on 11 March 2012 in Wigan's away match at his former dual registration club; Widnes.

He played in the 2013 Challenge Cup Final victory over Hull F.C. at Wembley Stadium.

Widnes
During 2011, Tomkins played 14 times on dual registration at Widnes. He scored 6 tries for the then Championship Side.

Salford loans
In 2014, Logan joined Salford on a loan deal. He made his first appearance for the club against Bradford Bulls in Salford's 38-24 win. In his third appearance, against Leeds, Logan scored his team's only try in Salford's 32-4 defeat. On 22 April 2014, Logan agreed to stay with Salford for the rest of the 2014 season.

Tomkins returned to Salford on loan again in 2015.

Workington
Also in 2015, Tomkins played two games for Workington Town on dual registration from Wigan.

Salford
Logan Tomkins made the permanent switch to Salford on 25 November 2015, signing a one-year deal for the 2016 season.

He played in the 2019 Super League Grand Final defeat by St. Helens at Old Trafford.

Family
Logan Tomkins is the youngest brother of former Wigan teammates Joel Tomkins and Sam Tomkins.

References

External links
Salford Red Devils profile
SL profile

1992 births
Living people
English rugby league players
Rugby league hookers
Rugby league players from Wigan
Salford Red Devils players
Widnes Vikings players
Wigan Warriors players
Workington Town players